KKSW is a radio station in Lawrence, Kansas, broadcasting to the Topeka and Kansas City areas on 105.9 FM. The station offers a Top 40/CHR format.

History
On August 20, 1963, KLWN-FM first signed on. Its original purpose was a full-time signal to broadcast weather, sports, and other information, including things like school closings.  The FM station was originally run by a tape, at that time the station's most popular programming was University of Kansas or Lawrence High football games.

The station started with technical facilities of 17 kW on 105.9 MHz. From 1963 to 1974, both stations shared the same studio. KLWN-FM essentially simulcast the AM during daylight hours until 1972. In 1972, the staff began a separate rock programming that was broadcast in the overnight hours, first after the AM sign-off, and then it was pre-taped and replayed the next day at 3 PM, later noon. On April 1, 1974, an addition to the station allowed the AM to move into a new studio (complete with an interview room) and the FM to have the old one.  For several years, "The Music Station 106" was the FM on-air name.  Then on July 31, 1979, KLWN-FM received the new calls of KLZR and was authorized to increase power to 100 kW. The new 550-foot tower was completed and the new transmitter was put in use in December.

Up through to the mid-1980s, KLZR (sometimes then referred to by on-air disk jockeys as "Lazer Rock") heavily featured a new wave format, with artists such as Icehouse, Split Enz, Mi-Sex, and The Cure, as well as Elvis Costello, The Tubes, and Joe Jackson.

During the 1990s, KLZR carried a modern rock format, which was popular on the KU campus and in the college town atmosphere of Lawrence, as well as Kansas City; even garnering a mention in Rolling Stone magazine as one of the top ten "Stations that Didn't Suck" in 1998. The station was independently owned by the Booth family until they sold the station to the Zimmer Radio Group on September 1, 1998. (Zimmer member Jerry Zimmer separated the station from the group in 2005, returning KLZR to a local ownership status under the incorporated name "Great Plains Media".) After the sale, KLZR morphed into a Top 40 station. Booth wasn't aware of the change before he sold the station, and even told the media that there was no plan on changing formats.  Weeks later, the station was playing boy bands from grunge rock.  The change created a blow back from the local fans of the station that enjoyed the independent music choices and lead in the local music community.  Groups protested the change, picketing outside the station and in local papers The Kansan and The Journal World, as well as petitions with thousands of signature and shirts with "The New Lazer Sucks" printed on them circled around.  The change didn't affect just the community, but also some of the employees that worked hard at creating their unique playlists.  The anger peaked one night when two windows were broken, the second one after Booth stated on the air that he hoped it had nothing to do with the change.  In 2003, the station shifted formats again, this time to a Hot Adult Contemporary format, because of low ratings from the earlier format change.

On January 20, 2012, KLZR began stunting with all-Lady Gaga music. Later that day, at 3 p.m., the station re-branded as "105.9 Kiss FM" and returned to a Top 40 format. On February 7, 2012, KLZR changed call letters to KKSW to match the new branding.

References

External links
Official Website

KSW
Contemporary hit radio stations in the United States
Lawrence, Kansas
Radio stations established in 1963
1963 establishments in Kansas